Nicholas Bosanquet (born 17 January 1942) is a British health economist and former political activist.

Bosanquet was educated at Winchester College, then he studied history at Clare College, Cambridge. He attended Yale University as a Mellon Fellow, and returned to England to study economics at the London School of Economics (LSE), before he became an economic advisor to the National Board of Prices and Incomes. From 1969, Bosanquet lectured in economics at the LSE. Focusing on health economics, he was at the King's Fund College from 1973 until 1986, then moved to the University of York, before becoming a professor at the University of London. Since 1993, Bosanquet has been Professor of Health Policy at Imperial College London.

Bosanquet served on the executive of the Fabian Society from 1968 until 1977. He chaired the Young Fabians in 1968–69, and as chair of the Fabian Society in 1974–75. He stood for the Labour Party in the 1969 Weston-super-Mare by-election, taking third place, with 14.6% of the vote.

In 1971, Bosanquet was unsuccessful in standing to be a Labour councillor for the Adelaide ward on Camden Council. He stood in 1974 and was elected, as Labour councillor, for the Camden ward, and was re-elected in 1978 for the Caversham ward. In 1982 unsuccessfully he stood again for the same ward, however this time for the Social Democratic Party, having joined the party in 1981. Bosanquet stood in Slough at the 1983 UK general election, and in Stockton North at the 1987 UK general election. He also served on the party's housing and urban policy working parties.
 
Bosanquet has also served as an advisor to the World Health Organization and to the World Bank, as a special advisor to the Health Committee of the House of Commons, and as an arbitrator for ACAS.  In addition to works on health economics, he has authored Our Land at War: Britain's key First World War sites.

Bosanquet married Anne Connolly in 1974, and they had two daughters, however the pair divorced in 1993. In 1996, he married Anna Zarzecka until their divorce in 2016. Bosanquet lives in York and states his recreations as 'visiting battlefields, brainstorming with Americans and others about military history'.

References

1947 births
Living people
Academics of Imperial College London
Academics of the London School of Economics
Academics of the University of York
Alumni of the London School of Economics
Alumni of Clare College, Cambridge
Chairs of the Fabian Society
Labour Party (UK) parliamentary candidates
People educated at Winchester College
Social Democratic Party (UK) parliamentary candidates
Labour Party (UK) councillors
Councillors in the London Borough of Camden